Savines-le-Lac (Vivaro-Alpine: Savina lo Lac) is a commune in the Hautes-Alpes department in southeastern France.

Population

Twin towns — sister cities
Savines-le-Lac is twinned with:

  Luserna San Giovanni, Italy

See also
Communes of the Hautes-Alpes department

References

Communes of Hautes-Alpes
Caturiges